Michaela Ek (born 1 February 1988) is a Swedish female handballer who plays for TIF Viking and the Swedish national team.

International honours 
Carpathian Trophy: 
Winner: 2015

References

1988 births
Living people
People from Skövde Municipality
Swedish female handball players
Expatriate handball players
Swedish expatriate sportspeople in Denmark
Handball players at the 2016 Summer Olympics
Olympic handball players of Sweden
Sportspeople from Västra Götaland County